Henwood is a hamlet about  south-west of Oxford, England. Henwood is in Wootton civil parish in the Vale of White Horse district.

Historically Henwood was a single farm in the parish of Cumnor, until Wootton was created a separate parish in the 19th century. Since then there has been ribbon development along the B4017 road. Henwood was in Berkshire until the 1974 boundary changes transferred it to Oxfordshire.

Henwood Farmhouse dates back to the 17th century. It is a Grade II Listed Building.

References

Villages in Oxfordshire
Vale of White Horse